David Brighty CMG CVO (born 7 February 1939) is a retired British diplomat who was ambassador to several countries.

Career
Anthony David Brighty was educated at Northgate Grammar School (now Northgate High School (Ipswich)) and Clare College, Cambridge. He joined the Foreign Office in 1961, served in Brussels and Havana, then in 1969 resigned and spent two years working for S. G. Warburg & Co. He rejoined the Foreign Office in 1971 and served at Saigon and at the UK mission to the United Nations in New York, then attended the Royal College of Defence Studies in 1979. He was head of the Personnel Operations Department at the Foreign and Commonwealth Office 1980–83, Counsellor at Lisbon 1983–86, and Director of the Cabinet of the Secretary General of NATO (Lord Carrington) 1986–87.
He was ambassador to Cuba 1989–91 and to Czechoslovakia 1991–93, then after the dissolution of Czechoslovakia he was ambassador both to the Czech Republic and (non-resident) to Slovakia 1993–94. He was ambassador to Spain and (non-resident) to Andorra 1994–98. 
After retiring from the Diplomatic Service, Brighty has been a non-executive director of EFG Private Bank and of Henderson EuroMicro Investment Trust. In 2003 he was Robin Humphreys Fellow at the Institute of Latin American Studies, University of London. He is chairman of the Cañada Blanch Centre for Contemporary Spanish Studies at the London School of Economics.

Publications
Cuba Under Castro: Ambassadorial Reflections, Institute of Latin American Studies, 2004

References

Further reading
BRIGHTY, (Anthony) David, Who's Who 2013, A & C Black, 2013; online edn, Oxford University Press, Dec 2012

1939 births
Living people
People educated at Northgate Grammar School, Ipswich
Alumni of Clare College, Cambridge
S. G. Warburg & Co. people
Ambassadors of the United Kingdom to Cuba
Ambassadors of the United Kingdom to Czechoslovakia
Ambassadors of the United Kingdom to the Czech Republic
Ambassadors of the United Kingdom to Slovakia
Ambassadors of the United Kingdom to Spain
Ambassadors of the United Kingdom to Andorra
Companions of the Order of St Michael and St George
Commanders of the Royal Victorian Order
Recipients of the Order of Prince Henry
Place of birth missing (living people)